The Virginia Senate election of 1999 was held on Tuesday, November 2.

Overall results

See also
 United States elections, 1999
 Virginia elections, 1999
 Virginia House of Delegates election, 1999

References 

Senate
Virginia
Virginia Senate elections